Body and Soul is the third EP by the Sisters of Mercy, recorded in March 1984. It was the first release under a distribution contract with WEA, issued on 12" vinyl on 4 June 1984 by Merciful Release, the band's label. The EP was never released on CD, but the title track was included on the A Slight Case of Overbombing collection.

Track listing

Personnel
Andrew Eldritch - vocals
Craig Adams - bass guitar
Wayne Hussey - guitar
Gary Marx - guitar
Doktor Avalanche (drum machine) - drums

References

1984 EPs
The Sisters of Mercy EPs
Merciful Release EPs
Warner Music Group EPs